Trupanea superdecora is a species of tephritid or fruit flies in the genus Trupanea of the family Tephritidae.

Distribution
Congo, Uganda & Kenya to Namibia, Reunion, Mauritius, South Africa.

References

Tephritinae
Insects described in 1924
Taxa named by Mario Bezzi
Diptera of Africa